Short-track speed skating at the 1986 Asian Winter Games took place in the city of Sapporo, Japan, with eight events being contested – four each for men and women.

Medalists

Men

Women

Medal table

References
 Results of the First Winter Asian Games

 
1986 Asian Winter Games events
1986
International speed skating competitions hosted by Japan
1986 in short track speed skating